The Harroun was an automobile manufactured in Wayne, Michigan by the Harroun Motor Sales Corporation from 1916 to 1920. The company bore the name of its founder, racing legend Ray Harroun, who in 1911 won the first Indianapolis 500 Sweepstakes.

The Company 

The Harroun Motors Corporation raised $10,000,000 in stock to begin a car company. Harroun bought the buildings and equipment of the former Prouty and Glass Carriage Company in 1916 for $40,000. The old carriage factory was 80,000 square feet and used for paint and upholstery, and in 1917 Harroun built a new 1,220,000 square foot factory next door for all other processes. The company operated for 12–18 months producing 200 cars per day. There were three models offered, a roadster and a touring car (each priced at $595) and a sedan ($850), each powered by the company's own four-cylinder engine. Cars were only available with a green body, brown roof and black fenders and upholstery. The roadster was only available in midnight blue. The goal was to get the price of cars below $500 to remain profitable. In 1918 Harroun also invented and patented a shock absorbing steering wheel to reduce driver fatigue.

The War 
In the spring of 1918 the company got a government contract to produce 200,000 artillery shells during World War I. The plan was to produce cars and artillery shells together in the factory, but the government sent an arbitrary order limiting the factory to only 25 cars per day. Harroun produced 23,899 155mm howitzer high explosive, Mark I, Type B shells for the war effort. The shells weighed 93 pounds and were stamped with a letter "R", the only marking to indicate the maker. Shells were loaded onto the Detroit United Railways streetcar that ran through Wayne and whisked to Detroit, where they were filled and capped.

Closure 
After the war, the company tried to get started again, creating a new model for 1920. Representatives took the car on a tour from Detroit to Montana and on to Denver to prove its reliability. The tour went well, but the company still closed in 1920. Fewer that 3,000 cars were built and two are known to survive. In 1923 the company assets were sold off and the factory bought by the Gotfredson Truck Company in 1924.

A 1919 Harroun Model A-1 Sold at auction in September 2019 for $33,000.

References 

 
 

Defunct motor vehicle manufacturers of the United States
Motor vehicle manufacturers based in Michigan
Defunct companies based in Michigan
Vehicle manufacturing companies established in 1917
Companies based in Wayne County, Michigan
1917 establishments in Michigan
Vehicle manufacturing companies disestablished in 1923
1923 disestablishments in Michigan